Summit is an unincorporated community in Smithfield Township, DeKalb County, Indiana.

History
A post office was established at Summit in 1871, and remained in operation until it was discontinued in 1908. Summit was named for its lofty elevation.

Geography

References

Unincorporated communities in DeKalb County, Indiana
Unincorporated communities in Indiana